Juliane Votteler (born 1960) is a German dramaturge and theatre director.

Life 
Born in Stuttgart, Votteler, daughter of the industrial designer , studied old and New German Literary Studies, Theatre, Film and Television Studies and philosophy at the Friedrich-Alexander-Universität Erlangen-Nürnberg, the University of Vienna and the Goethe University Frankfurt

At the Nationaltheater Mannheim she was dramaturg under the direction of artistic director Arnold Petersen, at the Theater Basel under Frank Baumbauer.

From 1993 to 2006, she was chief dramaturge at the Stuttgart State Opera and from 2007 to July 2017, she was artistic director of the Theater Augsburg.

Productions 
 2014: Hänsel und Gretel
 2014: Lohengrin
 2015: Wozzeck
 2015: Der König Kandaules

References

External links 
 Juliane Votteler on the website of the Theater Augsburg.
 WDR 3 (Westdeutscher Rundfunk) Mosaik. Gespräch am Samstag, 17 August 2019

Dramaturges
Women theatre directors
1960 births
Living people
People from Stuttgart